This page documents all tornadoes confirmed by various weather forecast offices of the National Weather Service in the United States from August to October 2017.

United States yearly total

August

August 2 event

August 3 event

August 4 event

August 5 event

August 6 event

August 7 event

August 9 event

August 11 event

August 12 event

August 13 event

August 15 event

August 16 event

August 17 event

August 18 event

August 19 event

August 21 event

August 22 event

August 25 event
Events were associated with Hurricane Harvey.

August 26 event
Texas and Louisiana events were associated with Hurricane Harvey.

August 27 event
Events were associated with Hurricane Harvey.

August 28 event
Events were associated with Hurricane Harvey.

August 29 event
Events were associated with Hurricane Harvey.

August 30 event
Events were associated with Hurricane Harvey.

August 31 event
Events were associated with Hurricane Harvey.

September

September 1 event

September 4 event

September 9 event
Florida events were associated with Hurricane Irma.

September 10 event
Events were associated with Hurricane Irma.

September 11 event
Events were associated with Hurricane Irma.

September 13 event

September 15 event

September 19 event

September 20 event

September 21 event

September 25 event

September 30 event

October

October 2 event

October 6 event

October 7 event
Alabama and Mississippi events were associated with Hurricane Nate.

October 8 event
Events were associated with Hurricane Nate.

October 12 event

October 14 event

October 20 event

October 21 event

October 22 event

October 23 event

October 24 event

October 28 event
Events were associated with Tropical Storm Philippe.

October 31 event

See also
 Tornadoes of 2017
 List of United States tornadoes from June to July 2017

Notes

References

2017 natural disasters in the United States
2017-related lists
Tornadoes of 2017
Tornadoes
2017, 08